1619 Broadway: The Brill Building Project is a 2012 album by Kurt Elling, recorded as a tribute to the songwriters of the Brill Building in New York City.

At the 55th Annual Grammy Awards, Elling was nominated for the Grammy Award for Best Jazz Vocal Album for his performance on this album, losing to Radio Music Society by Esperanza Spalding.

Track listing

Kurt Elling and Laurence Hobgood arranged tracks 1 and 8-11, track 2 together with John Mc Lean, track 5 with Clark Sommers. Laurence Hobgood provided arrangements for tracks 2, 4 and 6, and wrote all horn section arrangements.

Personnel
Performance
Kurt Elling - voice
Laurence Hobgood - piano, electric piano (tracks 3, 9), organ (5, 7)
Clark Sommers - bass (exc. 10)
Kendrick Scott - drums (exc. 4, 10), congas (5, 9)
John McLean - guitar (1, 3, 6, 8, 9), acoustic guitar  (8)
Tom Luer - tenor saxophone (2, 4, 11), alto saxophone (11)
Kye Palmer - flugelhorn (2, 4, 11), trumpet (11)
Joel Frahm - tenor saxophone (4, 7) 
Ernie Watts - tenor saxophone (5, 8)
Christian McBride - voice (7)

Production
Chris Dunn, Kurt Elling and Laurence Hobgood - producers
Darryl Pitt - co-producer, artist management
Chris Allen - recording engineer (at Sear Sound, NY)
Ted Tuthill - assistant engineer
Kevin Harper, Owen Mulholland - assistants
Seth Presant - engineer for additional recordings, and mixing (at The Village Studios, LA)
Paul Blakemore - mastering
Mary Hogan - A&R administration
Phil Galdston - A&R consultant
Larissa Collins - art direction
Neal Ashby - package design
Neil Tesser - liner notes

References

Tribute albums to music-related organizations
Kurt Elling albums
2012 albums
Concord Records albums